The 2011 IIHF World U18 Championship Division II was an international under-18 ice hockey competition organised by the International Ice Hockey Federation. Both Division II tournaments made up the third level of the IIHF World U18 Championships. The Group A tournament was played in Braşov, Romania, and the Group B tournament was played in Donetsk, Ukraine. Austria and Ukraine won the Group A and B tournaments respectively and gained promotion to the Division I of the 2012 IIHF World U18 Championships.

Group A
The Group A tournament was played in Braşov, Romania, from 19 to 25 March 2011.

Final Standings

Results
All times are local (EET – UTC+02:00).

Group B
The Group B tournament was played in Donetsk, Ukraine, from 27 March to 2 April 2011.

Final Standings

Results
All times are local (EEST – UTC+03:00).

See also
2011 IIHF World U18 Championships
2011 IIHF World U18 Championship Division I
2011 IIHF World U18 Championship Division III

References

External links 
 IIHF.com

IIHF World U18 Championship Division II
2011 IIHF World U18 Championships
International ice hockey competitions hosted by Estonia
International ice hockey competitions hosted by Ukraine
International ice hockey competitions hosted by Romania
2010–11 in Estonian ice hockey
Rom
Rom